Domaslavice may refer to:
 Dolní Domaslavice, a village in Frýdek-Místek District, Czech Republic
 Horní Domaslavice, a village in Frýdek-Místek District, Czech Republic